Fatih Baydar (born November 25, 1983) is a Turkish  weightlifter competing in the –85 kg division.

At the 2012 European Championships held in Antalya, Turkey, he became silver medalist.

He was due to compete at the 2012 Olympic Games but was withdrawn after his A-sample tested positive for hydroxystanozolol during a drug test. He was suspended for 2 years.

Achievements

References

External links
International Weightlifting Federation

1983 births
Living people
Turkish male weightlifters
Doping cases in weightlifting
European Weightlifting Championships medalists
21st-century Turkish people